The 1923–24 Scottish Division Three was the first season of the Scottish Division Three, the third-tier of Scottish football. It began on 18 August 1923 and ended on 28 April 1924.  It was won by Arthurlie who, along with second placed East Stirlingshire, gained promotion to Division Two. Brechin City finished bottom.

Clubs

Table

Results

Notes

References 

Scottish Division Three seasons
3